James Fergus Cruickshank (13 April 1941 – 18 November 2010) was a Scottish footballer who played as a goalkeeper. He played for Heart of Midlothian through most of the 1960s and 1970s, making nearly 400 league appearances. He had brief spells with Queen's Park at the start of his career and spent his final season with Dumbarton. Cruickshank also represented Scotland and the Scottish League.

Life and career 

Cruickshank appeared 30 times in league games for the Hampden Park football club Queen's Park between 1958 and 1960. He joined Hearts in 1960 and left the club in 1977 after 17 years of service. He made 528 appearances for the first team and turned out 394 times in league matches. After leaving Hearts He joined Dumbarton, where he featured in three league matches before retiring from the game.

He made nine appearances for the Scotland national football team, and was on the losing side only once. Cruickshank made three appearances during a 1967 overseas tour that the Scottish Football Association decided in October 2021 to reclassify as full internationals, which increased his cap tally from six to nine.

Death 

Cruickshank died on 18 November 2010, aged 69. Former Hearts players Jim Jefferies and Craig Gordon paid tribute to Cruickshank, describing him as a "top goalie" and "undoubtedly one of the best" to play for Hearts.

On 20 November 2010 Hearts paid tribute to Cruickshank by holding a one-minute silence before their game against Hamilton Accies. Marian Kello, the then current first choice goalkeeper for Hearts, also tied a yellow goalkeeper's jersey with Cruickshank's name and number on the back to his net. During the game, Kello saved a Hamilton penalty kick. Hearts manager Jim Jefferies said after the game that "Jim Cruickshank was a great penalty saver. How fitting is it that Marian comes out with the jersey and makes a fantastic save from a penalty on the day we paid our respects to him".

References

External links 
 Player statistics, Heart of Midlothian FC at londonhearts.com
 
 

1941 births
Footballers from Glasgow
Scotland international footballers
Scottish footballers
Association football goalkeepers
Queen's Park F.C. players
Heart of Midlothian F.C. players
Dumbarton F.C. players
Scottish Football League players
2010 deaths
Scottish Football League representative players
Scotland under-23 international footballers
Scotland amateur international footballers